Souleymane Dela Sacko (born 19 November 1984) is a Nigerien footballer who plays as a midfielder for AS SONIDEP and the Niger national football team. He was part of the team in World Cup qualifiers.

Career
He previously played in Étoile Filante Ouagadougou in Burkina Faso.

International career
He is a member of the Niger national football team. He usually wears number 12. He was the captain of the team in 2008.

International goals
Scores and results list Niger's goal tally first.

References

External links 

FIFA Profile

1977 births
Living people
People from Niamey
Nigerien footballers
Niger international footballers
2013 Africa Cup of Nations players
Étoile Filante de Ouagadougou players
AS Korofina players
AS Mangasport players
Olympic FC de Niamey players
AS GNN players
AS Douanes (Niger) players
AS SONIDEP players
Nigerien expatriate footballers
Expatriate footballers in Mali
Expatriate footballers in Burkina Faso
Expatriate footballers in Gabon
Nigerien expatriate sportspeople in Mali
Nigerien expatriate sportspeople in Burkina Faso
Nigerien expatriate sportspeople in Gabon

Association football midfielders
Niger A' international footballers
2016 African Nations Championship players